David Hogan may refer to:
David Hogan (programmer), Australian programmer, creator of 9wm
Dave Hogan (born 1989), English football goalkeeper
David Hogan (composer) (1949–1996), American composer and musical director of CIGAP
David Hogan (snooker player) (born 1988), Irish professional snooker player
David Hogan, pseudonym of Frank Gallagher, Irish author
David Hogan (priest), Roman Catholic priest